The Mariensäule (lit. 'Mary's Column') is a Marian column located on the Marienplatz in Munich, Germany. Mary is revered here as Patrona Bavariae (Latin: Protector of Bavaria).

History
It was erected in 1638 to celebrate the end of Swedish occupation during the Thirty Years' War, to be precise, following a respective vow by Duke Elector Maximilian I of Bavaria if the ducal residential cities of Munich and Landshut would be spared from war destruction. The column is topped by a golden statue of the Virgin Mary standing on a crescent moon as the Queen of Heaven, created in 1590.  The figure was originally located in the Frauenkirche. Mariensäule in Munich was the first column of this type built north of the Alps and inspired erecting other Marian columns in this part of Europe.

Features
At each corner of the column's pedestal is a statue of a putto, created by Ferdinand Murmann. The four putti are each depicted fighting a different beast, symbolizing the city's overcoming of adversities: war represented by the lion, pestilence by the cockatrice, hunger or famine by the dragon and heresy by the serpent.

The full inscription is as follows (with a translation)

References

Buildings and structures in Munich
Tourist attractions in Munich
Registered historic buildings and monuments in Bavaria